Arron Spencer Davis (born 11 February 1972) is an English former footballer who played in the Football League as a full-back for Torquay United and Colchester United.

Career

Born in Wanstead, London, Davis joined Torquay United as a youth, progressing into the first-team to eventually make 24 Football League appearances between 1991 and 1993. He later joined Plymouth Argyle, failing to make an appearance, though in 1994 he joined Colchester United on loan, making his debut in a 2–0 away defeat to Mansfield Town on 20 August 1994 and making his final appearance on 3 September in a 1–0 win at Scarborough, totalling four appearances for the club. He later played for Dorchester Town.

References

1972 births
Living people
People from Wanstead
English footballers
Association football fullbacks
Torquay United F.C. players
Plymouth Argyle F.C. players
Colchester United F.C. players
Dorchester Town F.C. players
English Football League players